The National Unity Party (PUN) is a political party in Haiti. It was the de facto only political party in the country during the Duvalier dynasty, the autocratic family dictatorship of François "Papa Doc" Duvalier and his son Jean-Claude "Baby Doc" Duvalier, which lasted from 1957 to 1986.

History 
The PUN was founded in 1957 as a political platform to support the presidential candidacy of "Papa Doc" Duvalier in the 1957 general election. In the aftermath of the July 1958 coup d'état attempt, the Tonton Macoute — officially named Volunteers of the National Security (VSN) — was formed as the paramilitary wing of the PUN. In 1963, other political parties in Haiti were outlawed, making the PUN the single political party of the nation.

When "Papa Doc" Duvalier died in 1971, his son "Baby Doc" Duvalier succeeded him as the President of the country and the leader of the party. The party would remain in power until the fall and exile of "Baby Doc" Duvalier in 1986, at the height of the Anti-Duvalier protest movement, after which the party would enter a low profile stage, including the change of its name to National Progressive Party (PPN).

After the return of "Baby Doc" Duvalier from exile in 2011, the party began a process of reconstitution under its original name from 2014, and started opening departmental offices. Suffering a setback with the death of "Baby Doc" Duvalier in 2014, the party nominated Marc-Arthur Drouillard as its candidate in the 2015 presidential election. Towards that time, the legal representative of the party was Philomène Exe.

Electoral history

Presidential elections

Chamber of Deputies elections

See also 
 Dominican Party, the ruling party of the neighboring Dominican Republic under Rafael Trujillo between 1930–1961.

References 

Political parties in Haiti
Parties of one-party systems
Political parties established in 1957
Haitian nationalism
African and Black nationalism in North America
African and Black nationalist parties
Afro-Haitian culture
Anti-communist parties
1957 establishments in Haiti